Opostega argentella is a moth of the family Opostegidae. It was described by John David Bradley in 1957. It is known from the Solomon Islands.

Adults have been recorded in November.

References

Opostegidae
Moths described in 1957